Tactusa spadix is a moth of the family Erebidae first described by Michael Fibiger in 2010. It is known from southern Laos, in Southeast Asia.

Description
The wingspan of Tactusa spadix is about 12 mm.

The ground colour of the forewings is brown, with a very large black triangular patch, including the fringes, that extends from the antemedial point on the costa to the apex and to the tornal edge. There is a large, light-brown patch present inside this large patch, located close to the apex. Only the terminal lines are visible as blackish-brown interneural spots.

The hindwing is dark grey, with an indistinct discal spot and the underside is unicolorous grey.

References

Micronoctuini
Taxa named by Michael Fibiger
Moths described in 2010
Moths of Asia